The .30 Newton cartridge was designed by Charles Newton, based on a German caliber of the period, the 11.2x72 Schuler.

Newton originally called the cartridge the 30 Adolph Express after Fred Adolph, a well known immigrant gunsmith from Germany at the time, who had proposed the idea of necking rimless German cartridges down to produce a high velocity hunting cartridge. 

The Newton Arms Company was the only manufacturer of commercial rifles chambered for this cartridge.  It should not be confused with the .30 Belted Newton (a.k.a. .30-338), which is a different cartridge not designed by Charles Newton. Although suitable for any large North American game, it is an obsolete round no longer manufactured. Before World War II, loaded cartridges were once offered by Western Cartridge Company. Small runs of 30 Newton brass are occasionally made by Jamison Brass and Roberson Brass.  Cases for 30 Newton can be easily made from .375 Ruger as they are very similar other than the caliber of the case neck; so much so that many assume Ruger based their cartridge on the 30 Newton case.  8x68S brass can also be used.

See also
List of rifle cartridges
.35 Newton

Notes

References

Barnes, Frank C. Cartridges of the World. 3rd Edition: 1972.
http://www.reloadersnest.com/frontpage.asp?CaliberID=182

https://www.rccbrass.com/product/30-newton/

Magnum rifle cartridges
Newton rifle cartridges
Pistol and rifle cartridges